Sarde is a surname. Notable people with the surname include:

Alain Sarde (born 1952),  French film producer and actor
Cliff Sarde, American composer, multi-instrumentalist and recording artist
Philippe Sarde (born 1948), French film composer

Ethnonymic surnames